Matrimony's Speed Limit is a 1913 silent short film produced and directed by pioneering female film maker Alice Guy-Blaché. It was produced by Solax Studios when it and many other early film studios in America's first motion picture industry were based in Fort Lee, New Jersey, at the beginning of the 20th century.  It is one of only about 150 films surviving out of the more than one thousand produced and/or directed by Guy-Blaché.

The film's preservation, along with a few others by Guy-Blaché, was initially financed by the Women's Film Preservation Fund upon its inauguration in 1995. It was selected to the National Film Registry by the Library of Congress in 2003.

In December 2018, Kino Lorber released a six-disc box, Pioneers: First Women Filmmakers, made in cooperation with the Library of Congress, the British Film Institute and others. The first disc of the set is devoted to the films of Guy-Blaché and includes Matrimony's Speed Limit (1913).

Plot 
The story concerns a young man (Fraunie Fraunholz) who refuses to accept financial assistance from his wealthy girlfriend (Marian Swayne) in favor of earning his own fortune on the stock market. She concocts a plan to convince him that he will collect an inheritance from a wealthy aunt if he marries before noon. While he desperately proposes to every female he meets, she is trying to reach him before he finds a girl who will say yes. One veiled woman seems willing to accept his proposal, but (in a racist turn) she turns out to be African American (actually, a white actress in blackface). With only minutes to go before the deadline expires, he gives up his search and intends to commit suicide under the wheels of the next passing car. However, the vehicle contains both his fiancée and a minister who marries them on the spot.

Commentary 
In a brief essay written for a program at the Library of Congress, Professor Margaret Hennefeld remarks that the protagonist's encounter with the Black woman reveals that "the speed limit of matrimony is, in fact, racial miscegenation (in 1913 American culture)," and that the film "represents a crucial historical text that comically meditates upon the gendered, class, and racial fantasies and anxieties of early twentieth century American culture."

References

External links
Matrimony’s Speed Limit essay  by Margaret Hennefeld on the National Film Registry website

Matrimony’s Speed Limit essay by Daniel Eagan in America's Film Legacy: The Authoritative Guide to the Landmark Movies in the National Film Registry, A&C Black, 2010 , pages 28–29 

1913 films
Silent American comedy films
American black-and-white films
United States National Film Registry films
American silent short films
Films directed by Alice Guy-Blaché
Films shot in Fort Lee, New Jersey
1913 comedy films
1913 short films
American comedy short films
1910s American films